Feelings is an anthology of short fiction and non-fiction pieces written and edited by Evan X Hyde and published by the Angelus Press in Belize in 1975. The book was sponsored by Government Minister Lindbergh Rogers and presented under the alternate name Alif Ansar Mujahid, taken from Islam.

Notable pieces 
 "A Conscience for Christmas": short story about a playboy/Scrooge-type who learns the real value of Christmas. Later reprinted in the Belizean Writers Series.
 "Assad and Said": essay about rising political leaders Assad Shoman and Said Musa and the symbiosis they appear to share. Within a few years of this piece, Assad Shoman would retire from politics to devote his time to writing and consulting, eventually returning briefly to government service. Meanwhile, Musa would become leader of the People's United Party and ultimately Prime Minister of Belize.
 Haad Time: play about teenage pregnancy revived by the Belizean Writers Series.

1975 anthologies
Belizean books